Meg Hemphill (born 23 May 1996, in Kyotanabe, Kyoto) is a Japanese track and field athlete. She is the Japanese national champion in 2017 and was placed second in the 2017 Asian Athletics Championships heptathlon.

Hemphill was born in 1996. Her parents are from America and Japan.

She competed in the 2015 Asian Championships and the 2017 Asian Championships. In the latter she won the silver medal behind Swapna Barman of India, and beat Purnima Hembram, also of India.

She finished sixth at the 2018 Asian Games, and did not finish the competition at the 2019 Asian Championships.

References

1996 births
Living people
People from Tanabe, Wakayama
Sportspeople from Wakayama Prefecture
Japanese heptathletes
Asian Games competitors for Japan
Athletes (track and field) at the 2018 Asian Games
Japan Championships in Athletics winners
Japanese people of American descent